EuroNat was an organisation of European ultranationalist political parties, formed initially at the congress of the French National Front (FN) in Strasbourg on 30 March 1997. It had a loose organisational structure, and was in practice based on coordination by activities of the FN. The organisation failed to attract much support in Western Europe, as FN leader Jean-Marie Le Pen was more successful in gathering support in Eastern Europe. NordNat was an attempt to form a regional organisation by Nordic parties. As of the late 2000s, only the FN, BNP, ND, MS-FT, DN and NR parties were listed as members of EuroNat.

In a joint declaration, the founders of EuroNat expressed, among other things, the view that a "reborn" Europe "should be built with the European nations based on civilizations rooted in Greek, Celtic, Germanic, Latin and Christian traditions." The declaration was signed by representatives of, among others, Forza Nuova, the Greater Romanian Party and Democracia Nacional, as well as the previously mentioned Sweden Democrats and Front National.

Parties that at one point were part of the organisation include:

See also
Alliance of European National Movements
NordNat
European National Front (2004–2009)

References

Bibliography

 
Euro-Nat - The international network of the Sweden Democrats, Stieg Larsson, David Lagerlöf, Svend Johansen, Kerstin Zachrisson 
Euro-Nat: Sverigedemokraternas internationella nätverk, Stieg Larsson

External links
EuroNat Official Website

 
1997 establishments in Europe
Nationalist parties in Europe
Political parties established in 1997
Politics of Europe
Pan-European political parties
Neo-fascist organizations